Fußball-Club Eintracht Altona was an early German football club from Altona, then an independent city near Hamburg. The short-lived club is notable as one of the founding members of the German Football Association (Deutscher Fußball Bund) in 1900 in Leipzig, where they were represented by a former team captain of SC Victoria Hamburg, Walter Sommeyer (also written Sommeier).

Beginning in 1897, FC played a handful of seasons in the highest division of the Hamburger-Altonaer Fussballbund, until withdrawing one game into the second leg of the 1901/02 season. During its brief existence, the club performed poorly and was unable to score a goal in its abbreviated final campaign.

Unrelated clubs using the same name were established in the 1940s and again in 2010. The latter side was removed from the league in 2014 as part of disciplinary action.

Results 

* FC Eintracht Altona were awarded last place instead of Britannia Hamburg, who had only played two unofficial games, owing to the withdrawal of the team after the first half of the season.

 Most (confirmed) goals scored in a game: 7
 Most (confirmed) goals conceded in a game: 9

References

 Grüne, Hardy (1996). Vom Kronprinzen bis zur Bundesliga. Kassel: AGON Sportverlag .

Football clubs in Germany
Defunct football clubs in Germany
Association football clubs disestablished in 1902
Defunct football clubs in Hamburg
1902 disestablishments in Germany